Pittsburgh, the second-largest city in the U.S. state of Pennsylvania, is home to over 125 completed high-rise buildings of at least , 32 of which exceed . The tallest building in Pittsburgh is the 64-story U.S. Steel Tower, which rises , was completed in 1970, and is also the fifth tallest building in Pennsylvania. The second-tallest skyscraper in the city is BNY Mellon Center, which rises .

The history of skyscrapers in Pittsburgh began with the 1895 completion of the Carnegie Building; this structure, rising 13 floors, was the first steel-framed skyscraper to be constructed in the city. It never held the title of tallest structure in the city, however, as it did not surpass the  tower of the Allegheny County Courthouse, which was completed in 1888. The Carnegie Building was later demolished in 1952 to make way for an expansion of a Kaufmann's (now Burlington) department store. Pittsburgh experienced a large building boom from the late 1960s to the late 1980s. During this time, 11 of the city's 20 tallest buildings were constructed, including the city's three tallest structures, the U.S. Steel Tower, BNY Mellon Center, and PPG Place.  the entire city had 10 completed skyscrapers that rise at least , which ranks Pittsburgh's skyline 14th in the United States and 90th in the world, with two skyscrapers exceeding .

Unlike many other major American cities, Pittsburgh was the site of relatively few skyscraper construction projects in the first two decades of the 21st century. Only two skyscrapers over  have been completed since 2000. The  Three PNC Plaza was completed in 2010, and the  Tower at PNC Plaza was completed in 2015, making it the city's most recently completed skyscraper. Overall, there is one high-rise buildings over  under construction, The FNB Bank Building.

Tallest buildings
This includes spires and architectural details but does not include antenna masts. An equal sign (=) following a rank indicates the same height between two or more buildings. An asterisk (*) indicates that the building is still under construction, but has been topped out. The "Year" column indicates the year in which a building was completed.

Tallest approved or proposed
{| class="wikitable sortable"
|-
!scope=col| Name
! scope="col" style="width:75px;"|Height  
!scope=col| Floors
!scope=col| Year*
!scope=col|Status
!scope=col class="unsortable"| Notes
|-
| FNB Financial Center
| style="text-align:center;"| 
| style="text-align:center;"| 26
| style="text-align:center;"| 2023
| style="text-align:center;"| Under Construction
| Groundbreaking held on September 1, 2021, with construction to start by the end of the month.<ref>Davidson, Tom. Pittsburgh's URA, SEA boards approve project at former Civic Arena site. 'Pittsburgh Tribune-Review. June 10, 2021. Retrieved June 10, 2021.</ref>
|-
| 1501 Penn Former Wholey Warehouse Building
| style="text-align:center;"| 
| style="text-align:center;"| 23
| style="text-align:center;"| 2024
| style="text-align:center;"| Approved
|  
|-
|}

* Table entries with dashes (—) indicate that information regarding building dates of completion has not yet been released.

Timeline of tallest buildings
This lists buildings that once held the title of tallest building in Pittsburgh.

Tallest destroyed
This table lists buildings in Pittsburgh that were demolished and at one time stood at least .

See also
 Architecture of Pittsburgh
 List of tallest buildings in Camden
 List of tallest buildings in Philadelphia

 Explanatory notes

 References 
Specific

General
 

Further reading
 "Pittsburgh Then & Now"—Six-page Pittsburgh Post-Gazette'' feature on some of the city's iconic skyscrapers]
 "Who owns the skyline?"—News feature
 "A Mix of Old, New Buildings Gives City a Profile All Its Own"—1982 news feature on city's skyscraper boom
 "Tale of Two Towers: Similarities Only Skin Deep in 2 New Skyscrapers"—News feature

External links
 Diagram of Pittsburgh skyscrapers on SkyscraperPage

 
Pittsburgh
Buildings, Tallest
Tallest in Pittsburgh